Dr. Seth Brundle, also known as Brundlefly, is a fictional character and the anti-villain protagonist turned main antagonist in David Cronenberg's 1986 remake of The Fly. He is played by Jeff Goldblum. Brundle was the third of Goldblum's "nerdy scientist" roles (a character type he played previously in The Adventures of Buckaroo Banzai Across the 8th Dimension and Invasion of the Body Snatchers, and later played in The Race for the Double Helix, Jurassic Park, Independence Day, The Lost World: Jurassic Park and Jurassic World Dominion), and is one of his most famous roles to date.

The character of Brundle was played by Daniel Okulitch in Howard Shore's 2008 opera The Fly in its premiere at the Théâtre du Châtelet in Paris.

Fictional biography

Invention of the telepods

Seth Brundle mastered molecular physics at the age of 20, and devoted his life to developing a teleportation system, due to his severe motion sickness, to allow himself to travel places without getting sick. Brundle dedicated his life to his invention, and adopted personality traits similar to Albert Einstein, such as owning 5 pairs of the exact same set of clothing to save mental energy deciding what to wear. Brundle attended a convention hosted by Anton Bartok (who would eventually become the main antagonist in the sequel), where he met Particle Magazine journalist, Veronica Quaife. Brundle convinced Veronica to allow him to demonstrate his newly created "telepods" to her, gaining her intrigue when he stated that it would "change the world". Brundle was able to convince Veronica not to send her story on him to her boss, Stathis Borans, as he wasn't ready for the world to hear about it yet, in exchange for allowing Veronica to help on his projects. After the two share an intimate encounter, Brundle has an epiphany that the telepods were reinterpreting flesh instead of reproducing it, leading to Brundle reprogramming the system to allow the successful teleportation of a baboon. Veronica abruptly left to confront Stathis after learning he was planning to unveil Brundle's telepods prematurely, which Brundle interpreted as Veronica still being in love with Stathis. The drunken and depressed Brundle performs the telepod's human testing on himself to deprive Veronica witnessing his miracle of science. Unbeknownst to him, a common housefly had entered the telepod at the same time as him, leading to the computer merging the two together. Brundle sees the test as a success and reconciles with Veronica. When Brundle awakens in the morning, he finds that his reflexes and senses have enhanced. Brundle theorises that the telepods had somehow purified and improved his physicality. However, Veronica discovers coarse and unusual hairs growing out of Brundle's back, leading to a heated exchange where Brundle claims Veronica is simply jealous of him. Brundle attempted to force Veronica to use the telepods, but she refused and Brundle stormed off, abandoning her. Brundle entered a bar and entered an arm-wrestling competition with a man in exchange for his girlfriend, Tawny. Brundle uses his newfound superhuman strength to snap the man's arm and spends the rest of the night engaging in sexual escapades with Tawny. Brundle attempted to force Tawny to use the telepods, only for Veronica to intervene and Tawny and Veronica being kicked out of the laboratory. Brundle then enters his bathroom and notices his fingernails are beginning to fall off.

Degeneration

After this discovery, Brundle rushes to the computer and discovers that the telepods had merged him and the housefly together. Brundle eventually calls Veronica to reconcile, and confides with her that his body has begun to degenerate into a deformed hybrid creature he had begun calling "Brundlefly". Brundle also begins showing other fly-like characteristics such as consistently vomiting a corrosive enzyme on his food to be able to digest it and an addiction to sugary foods. Brundle becomes increasingly overwhelmed by the shock and horror of his mutation and begins finding the humour of his degeneration, including his ability to stick to walls, while still searching for a cure for his condition all the same. Brundle then comes to the conclusion that the only way to become human again is to use the telepods to merge with another human. Brundle overhears a conversation between Veronica and Stathis that Veronica is pregnant with Brundle's child, and plans to abort it. This led to Brundle storming into the clinic Veronica is at and abducting her before she can carry through with her abortion. Brundle begged Veronica to keep the child as it was "all that's left of him", Veronica confessed her fears that the child might be a hybrid as well. Brundle takes Veronica back to his warehouse and witnesses Stathis enter the facility with a shotgun. Brundle attacked Stathis and dissolved his left hand and right leg with his corrosive enzymes before Veronica pleaded with him not to kill Stathis.

Death

Brundle reveals his plan to Veronica to use the original two telepods to merge the two of them and their unborn child together in a third telepod that will act as a receiving pod. Veronica resisted him, and accidentally removed Brundle's jaw in the scuffle, prompting Brundle's final mutation, causing Brundle's rotting flesh to shed and reveal the gruesome man-housefly hybrid monster that had been growing inside of him. Brundlefly trapped Veronica inside telepod 1 and stepped inside telepod 2 to initiate the merge. Stathis, still conscious, severs the cables to telepod 1 with a shotgun to allow Veronica to escape safely. Brundlefly attempted to break out of the second telepod, but was too late, and becomes a monstrous combination of the hybrid and the metal of the telepods. As the Brundlefly-telepod hybrid exited the receiving pod, Brundle moved the shotgun Veronica was holding to his head, pleading for her to put him out of his misery. Veronica hesitated at first, but mercifully pulled the trigger, killing Brundle and leaving Veronica devastated.

Aftermath

Months after Brundle's death, Veronica dies while giving birth to their child, Martin. Martin continued his father's work and was often shown videotapes of Seth's work. Martin would eventually transform into a new version of Brundlefly, but was successfully able to cure his condition.

Production

Before Goldblum was cast, many actors were considered for the role of Seth Brundle, including Richard Dreyfuss, John Malkovich, Mel Gibson and Michael Keaton. John Lithgow was offered the role, but turned it down stating it was "too grotesque". Critics said that Brundle's transformation was used as a social commentary for the social paranoia surrounding the outbreak of HIV and AIDS, however Cronenberg denies this being the case as it was meant to be in place of diseases in general. Goldblum was against the original ending of the film where Veronica and Stathis end up back together. Goldblum believed that the ending would undermine the tragedy of the story. Even though some filmmakers insisted on keeping the ending, it was changed to the more tragic and abrupt ending in the movie.

Analysis

Ever since the original film's release, Brundle has been seen as a metaphor for the AIDS epidemic. Director David Cronenberg has said that he did not intend for Brundle to be a metaphor for AIDS in particular, but for disease in general. Brundle's degeneration was seen as an accurate representation of the effects AIDS has on the human body's immune system. The film was released in the middle of the AIDS outbreak in the United States, and the paranoia surrounding the disease and its effects, primarily on the gay community. Brundle is also shown engaging in several sexual escapades before his physical degeneration begins to manifest itself, shown having sexual intercourse with Tawny before his teeth begin falling out and his fingernails begin cracking off.

Legacy

Seth Brundle has become an iconic part of popular culture, referenced in many television shows and songs, as well as being recognised as one of Jeff Goldblum's best and most notable roles. Goldblum has cited Brundle as one of his favourites of the characters he has portrayed, and despite the character's apparent death at the end of the first movie, Goldblum has expressed interest in returning to the role. The character has also been heavily referenced in the animated television show Rick and Morty through human mutants called "Cronenbergs". Brundlefly is briefly referenced in the video game Tomb Raider III. Lara Croft, the protagonist of the game, tries to convince Doctor Willard to cease his experiments, as one of his men became a deadly mutant, with Lara mentioning the mutant's appearance to Brundlefly. Brundle was parodied on Saturday Night Live by Jim Carrey as 2020 presidential candidate Joe Biden in a reference to the fly that had landed on Vice President Mike Pence's head during the 2020 Vice-Presidential Debate. Fans have begun petitioning for Goldblum to reprise his role as Brundle for the program as the fly in the skit.

Goldblum was nominated for several awards for his role as Brundle, including winning the Saturn Award for Best Actor in 1986.

Notes
 Seth Brundle, who suffered from motion sickness, was ironically named after race car champion Martin Brundle (which was also used as the name of his son in The Fly II).
 Brundle's diseased metamorphosis was broken up into six stages by Chris Walas, Inc.'s makeup and creature effects crew (seven, if one includes the Brundlefly/Telepod fusion seen at the end of The Fly), ranging from facial discoloration to full-body rubber suits to highly-articulated puppets.

References 
  Content in this draft was copied from Brundlefly at the Villains Wiki, which is licensed under the Creative Commons Attribution-Share Alike 3.0 (Unported) (CC-BY-SA 3.0) license.

Fictional characters with disfigurements
Fictional characters with superhuman strength
Fictional human hybrids
Fictional mutants
Fictional scientists in films
Fictional flies
Science fiction film characters
The Fly (franchise)
Fictional mad scientists
Fictional inventors
Fictional stalkers
Fictional characters with superhuman senses
Film characters introduced in 1986
Male horror film characters
Male horror film villains
Fictional monsters
Fictional physicists